Andale is a city in Sedgwick County, Kansas, United States.  As of the 2020 census, the population of the city was 941.

History
Andale was founded in the early 1880s. The city's name is an amalgamation of the surnames of two families of pioneer settlers, the Andersons and Dales.

Andale was a station and shipping point on the Missouri Pacific Railroad.

Geography
Andale is located at  (37.791221, -97.629156).

Demographics

Andale is part of the Wichita, KS Metropolitan Statistical Area.

2010 census
As of the census of 2010, there were 928 people, 290 households, and 236 families living in the city. The racial makeup of the city was 98.7% White, 0.2% from other races, and 1.1% from two or more races. Hispanic or Latino of any race were 2.3% of the population.

There were 290 households, of which 52.4% had children under the age of 18 living with them, 63.1% were married couples living together, 12.4% had a female householder with no husband present, 5.9% had a male householder with no wife present, and 18.6% were non-families. 17.2% of all households were made up of individuals, and 7.6% had someone living alone who was 65 years of age or older. The average household size was 3.20 and the average family size was 3.67.

The median age in the city was 27.2 years. 38.7% of residents were under the age of 18; 8.8% were between the ages of 18 and 24; 25.6% were from 25 to 44; 18.9% were from 45 to 64; and 8.1% were 65 years of age or older. The gender makeup of the city was 48.7% male and 51.3% female.

2000 census
As of the census of 2000, there were 766 people, 241 households, and 186 families living in the city. The racial makeup of the city was 98.69% White, 0.13% Native American, 0.52% from other races, and 0.65% from two or more races. Hispanic or Latino of any race were 1.57% of the population.

There were 241 households, out of which 49.0% had children under the age of 18 living with them, 68.5% were married couples living together, 5.4% had a female householder with no husband present, and 22.8% were non-families. 20.3% of all households were made up of individuals, and 11.6% had someone living alone who was 65 years of age or older. The average household size was 3.18 and the average family size was 3.78.

In the city, the population was spread out, with 39.2% under the age of 18, 7.6% from 18 to 24, 27.3% from 25 to 44, 14.5% from 45 to 64, and 11.5% who were 65 years of age or older. The median age was 28 years. For every 100 females, there were 102.1 males. For every 100 females age 18 and over, there were 100.9 males.

The median income for a household in the city was $47,333, and the median income for a family was $53,702. Males had a median income of $40,909 versus $30,875 for females. The per capita income for the city was $17,439. About 2.7% of families and 1.1% of the population were below the poverty line, including none of those under age 18 and 6.8% of those age 65 or over.

Education
The community is served by Renwick USD 267 public school district.  Andale has one high school and one elementary school.  Andale High School is the home of the Andale Indians.  The school colors are black and gold.

Notable people
 B. J. Finney, football player
 Colton Haynes, model and actor.

References

Further reading

External links

 City of Andale
 Andale - Directory of Public Officials
 Andale city map, KDOT

Cities in Kansas
Cities in Sedgwick County, Kansas
Wichita, KS Metropolitan Statistical Area
Populated places established in the 1880s
1880s establishments in Kansas